Cirino is a surname. Notable people with the surname include:

Bruno Cirino (1936–1981), Italian actor and stage director
Dave Cirino, American singer-songwriter and producer
Marcelo Cirino (born 1992), Brazilian footballer 
Natale Cirino (1894–1962), Italian stage and film actor